Ittu Si Baat is an Indian Hindi-language romantic-comedy film directed by Adnan Ali and produced by Narendra Hirawat and Laxman Utekar. The film stars Bhupendra Jadawat, Gayatri Bharadwaj, Dheerendra Gautam, Ravi Kumar and Farida Jalal. The film was released on 17 June 2022.

Cast

 Bhupendra Jadawat as Bittu
 Gayatri Bharadwaj as Sapna
 Dheerendra Gautam as Cheeku
 Ravi Kumar as Salman
 Priyansh Jora as Vicky
 Farida Jalal as Dadi
 Neeraj Sood as Sapna's Father
 Sonali Sachdev as Sapna's Mother
 Atul Shrivastav as Bittu's Father
 Sapna Sand as Bittu's Mother
 Ayushi Lehri as Bittu's Sister

Production
The principal photography commenced March 2021 in Chunar, Varanasi. Ittu Si Baat is scheduled for a theatrical release on 17 June 2022.

Music 
The music of the film is composed by Vishal Mishra and lyrics written by Raj Shekhar.

References

External links 
 

Films shot in Varanasi
2020s Hindi-language films
2022 drama films
2022 films